Koro Toro is a settlement in southern Borkou-Ennedi-Tibesti Region in Chad. It hosts the Koro Toro Airport and a "notorious" maximum security desert prison used by the Chadian government to detain captured fighters of Boko Haram and Chadian rebel groups. According to the Chadian opposition, Koro Toro is factually a penal colony.

It is also known as anthropological and archaeological site, as the fossil hominin Australopithecus bahrelghazali was discovered at Koro Toro in January 1995.

References

Works cited 
 

Pliocene paleontological sites of Africa
Prehistoric Chad
Paleoanthropological sites